The Adma was a motorcycle manufactured in Germany between 1924 and 1926. The bikes were powered by 169cc two-stroke engine with an internal flywheel.

References

Motorcycle manufacturers of Germany